The Lei River is a right-bank tributary of the middle Xiang River in Hunan, China. It is also the longest tributary and has the second largest drainage system of the Xiang tributaries after the Xiao River. The Lei River has two sources: the Zhejiang River, which rises in the Leishan Mountains in the south of Rucheng County, and the Ou River, which rises in the Wanyang Mountains in the north of Guidong County. The two rivers join at Huangcaoping, Zixing City. The main stream of the Lei River runs generally south to northwest through Rucheng, Zixing, Suxian, Yongxing, Leiyang, Hengnan and Zhuhui counties and joins the Xiang at Leihekou of Zhuhui District of Hengyang.

References

Rivers of Hunan